Diana Cage (born July 16, 1979) is an American feminist author, editor, cultural critic and radio personality. Her work examines sexuality, feminism, and LGBT culture.

Career 
Cage began writing about sex and culture while interning under editor Lisa Palac at the San Francisco-based magazine Future Sex. In 2000, Cage's editorial work and extensive writing on sex and sexuality converged when she was hired as editor at the landmark lesbian magazine On Our Backs. During her tenure there, Cage operated the magazine according to her radical beliefs about sex and sexual identity, expanding the magazine's vision of what constituted lesbian sex. Erstwhile publisher of both On Our Backs and Girlfriends (magazine), Heather Findlay, praised Cage's "lack of self censorship" as an editor, saying, "[Cage] is not uptight about all forms of lesbian sexual expression. She really has no prejudgments about alternative sexuality." Cage has likewise been praised as an "unapologetic pioneer" in the evolution of progressive, sex-positive lesbian culture.

Cage resigned as editor in 2005, after editing a number of On Our Backs anthologies. The Publishing Triangle named Cage's On Our Backs Guide to Lesbian Sex one of the Most Notable Books of 2004.

From 2006 to 2009 Cage was host of The Diana Cage Show on SiriusXM The show was celebrated for Cage's bombastic monologues, incisive commentary on current events, and unflinching advice on love and sex.

Publications
In 2004 Cage published the IPPY award nominated, Box Lunch: A Layperson's Guide to Cunnilingus. Subsequent books include Threeways: Fulfill Your Ultimate Fantasy, and Girl Meets Girl: A Dating Survival Guide, as well as the On Our Backs Guide to Lesbian Sex, and On Our Backs: The Best Erotic Fiction. Her writing has been included anthologies, journals and magazines. She was a regular columnist for several magazines including Girlfriends, Kitchen Sink, Shewired, Frontiers, Good Vibes, Ourchart, and Velvetpark. In 2008 Cage was named one of GO magazine's 100 Women We Love.

In 2012 Cage wrote Mind-Blowing Sex: A Woman's Guide, a critical guide book that discusses the role that sexual liberation plays in a woman's ability to enjoy sex. Beginning with a brief historical overview, the book discusses the history of female sexual oppression and liberation.

Cage's most recent book is the Lambda Award-nominated Lesbian Sex Bible: The New Guide to Sexual Love for Same Sex Couples.

Teaching
Cage teaches at Pratt Institute. She has also taught at Hunter College, Brooklyn College, and University of the Arts.

Bibliography

TV/radio/video 
 Huffington Post Live, What Does it Mean to Identify as Queer, June 28, 2013
 Huffington Post Live, Decoding the Lesbian Mystique, June 24, 2013
 SiriusXM, recurring guest, The Derek and Romaine Show, 2004–2012
 SiriusXM, host, The Diana Cage Show, 2007–2009
 LOGO, featured commenter, CBS News on Logo, 2008
 Canal Jimmy (Italy), featured commenter, The L Word promo, 2007
 Here!, interview, Girls on Girls, September 2008
 Here!, interview, Here with Josh and Sara, August 2008
 Here!, featured commenter, Lesbian Sex and Sexuality Seasons 1 and 2, 2006, 2008
 SiriusXM, interview, The Michaelangelo Signorile Show, 2007
 Blowfish, producer and host, The Radio Blowfish Variety Show, 2005–2006
 Sex TV (Canada), featured commenter, Lesbian Erotica, 2002

References

External links 
 
 Diana Cage Tackles the Humorless Lesbian Myth
 Diana Cage interview on Here! With Josh and Sarah 
 Interview with Diana Cage on GaydarNation
 Diana Cage Profile
 Velvetpark media visits The Diana Cage Show
 Michelle Tea: I am an Anarchiste, Beyond Chron
 Curve Magazine Interview

Lesbian feminists
American lesbian writers
American sex columnists
American women columnists
Living people
LGBT people from California
Sex-positive feminists
American feminist writers
1969 births
Lambda Literary Award winners
Pratt Institute faculty
Writers from San Diego
American women academics
21st-century American LGBT people
21st-century American women writers